The 2003–04 Washington Capitals season was the Capitals's 30th season of play. The team finished in fifth and last-place in the Southeast Division, and fourteenth overall in the Eastern Conference, to miss the playoffs.

Offseason

Regular season
On December 10, 2003, head coach Bruce Cassidy was fired after a disappointing 8–18–1–1 start to the season. Assistant coach Glen Hanlon was named his replacement.

The Capitals were the most penalized team in the League, with 401 power-play opportunities against. They also scored the fewest short-handed goals in the League, with just 4.

Final standings

Schedule and results

|- align="center" bgcolor="#CCFFCC"
|1||W||October 9, 2003||6–1 || align="left"|  New York Islanders (2003–04) ||1–0–0–0 || 
|- align="center" bgcolor="#FFBBBB"
|2||L||October 11, 2003||3–4 || align="left"|  Atlanta Thrashers (2003–04) ||1–1–0–0 || 
|- align="center"
|3||T||October 13, 2003||2–2 OT|| align="left"| @ Toronto Maple Leafs (2003–04) ||1–1–1–0 || 
|- align="center" bgcolor="#FFBBBB"
|4||L||October 14, 2003||1–5 || align="left"| @ Montreal Canadiens (2003–04) ||1–2–1–0 || 
|- align="center" bgcolor="#FFBBBB"
|5||L||October 17, 2003||2–4 || align="left"| @ Dallas Stars (2003–04) ||1–3–1–0 || 
|- align="center" bgcolor="#FFBBBB"
|6||L||October 18, 2003||1–4 || align="left"| @ St. Louis Blues (2003–04) ||1–4–1–0 || 
|- align="center" bgcolor="#FFBBBB"
|7||L||October 23, 2003||1–5 || align="left"| @ Ottawa Senators (2003–04) ||1–5–1–0 || 
|- align="center" bgcolor="#FFBBBB"
|8||L||October 25, 2003||1–4 || align="left"| @ Toronto Maple Leafs (2003–04) ||1–6–1–0 || 
|- align="center" bgcolor="#FFBBBB"
|9||L||October 29, 2003||2–4 || align="left"|  Mighty Ducks of Anaheim (2003–04) ||1–7–1–0 || 
|- align="center" bgcolor="#CCFFCC"
|10||W||October 31, 2003||2–1 || align="left"|  Atlanta Thrashers (2003–04) ||2–7–1–0 || 
|-

|- align="center" bgcolor="#FFBBBB"
|11||L||November 1, 2003||1–2 || align="left"| @ Minnesota Wild (2003–04) ||2–8–1–0 || 
|- align="center" bgcolor="#CCFFCC"
|12||W||November 4, 2003||5–1 || align="left"| @ Tampa Bay Lightning (2003–04) ||3–8–1–0 || 
|- align="center" bgcolor="#FFBBBB"
|13||L||November 6, 2003||2–4 || align="left"| @ Philadelphia Flyers (2003–04) ||3–9–1–0 || 
|- align="center" bgcolor="#FFBBBB"
|14||L||November 8, 2003||2–3 || align="left"|  San Jose Sharks (2003–04) ||3–10–1–0 || 
|- align="center" bgcolor="#FFBBBB"
|15||L||November 10, 2003||2–3 || align="left"|  Los Angeles Kings (2003–04) ||3–11–1–0 || 
|- align="center" bgcolor="#CCFFCC"
|16||W||November 12, 2003||7–1 || align="left"|  Carolina Hurricanes (2003–04) ||4–11–1–0 || 
|- align="center" bgcolor="#FFBBBB"
|17||L||November 14, 2003||2–5 || align="left"|  Tampa Bay Lightning (2003–04) ||4–12–1–0 || 
|- align="center" bgcolor="#CCFFCC"
|18||W||November 15, 2003||2–1 || align="left"| @ Carolina Hurricanes (2003–04) ||5–12–1–0 || 
|- align="center" bgcolor="#FFBBBB"
|19||L||November 20, 2003||2–3 || align="left"| @ Boston Bruins (2003–04) ||5–13–1–0 || 
|- align="center" bgcolor="#FF6F6F"
|20||OTL||November 22, 2003||2–3 OT|| align="left"|  Florida Panthers (2003–04) ||5–13–1–1 || 
|- align="center" bgcolor="#CCFFCC"
|21||W||November 24, 2003||4–1 || align="left"| @ Detroit Red Wings (2003–04) ||6–13–1–1 || 
|- align="center" bgcolor="#FFBBBB"
|22||L||November 26, 2003||2–5 || align="left"| @ Buffalo Sabres (2003–04) ||6–14–1–1 || 
|- align="center" bgcolor="#FFBBBB"
|23||L||November 28, 2003||3–5 || align="left"|  Montreal Canadiens (2003–04) ||6–15–1–1 || 
|- align="center" bgcolor="#CCFFCC"
|24||W||November 29, 2003||5–3 || align="left"| @ Columbus Blue Jackets (2003–04) ||7–15–1–1 || 
|-

|- align="center" bgcolor="#CCFFCC"
|25||W||December 2, 2003||4–1 || align="left"| @ New York Islanders (2003–04) ||8–15–1–1 || 
|- align="center" bgcolor="#FFBBBB"
|26||L||December 4, 2003||0–3 || align="left"| @ New Jersey Devils (2003–04) ||8–16–1–1 || 
|- align="center" bgcolor="#FFBBBB"
|27||L||December 6, 2003||3–7 || align="left"| @ Los Angeles Kings (2003–04) ||8–17–1–1 || 
|- align="center" bgcolor="#FFBBBB"
|28||L||December 8, 2003||1–4 || align="left"| @ Colorado Avalanche (2003–04) ||8–18–1–1 || 
|- align="center" bgcolor="#CCFFCC"
|29||W||December 11, 2003||6–5 || align="left"|  Boston Bruins (2003–04) ||9–18–1–1 || 
|- align="center" bgcolor="#FFBBBB"
|30||L||December 13, 2003||1–5 || align="left"|  Detroit Red Wings (2003–04) ||9–19–1–1 || 
|- align="center" bgcolor="#CCFFCC"
|31||W||December 16, 2003||5–0 || align="left"| @ Atlanta Thrashers (2003–04) ||10–19–1–1 || 
|- align="center"
|32||T||December 17, 2003||2–2 OT|| align="left"| @ Florida Panthers (2003–04) ||10–19–2–1 || 
|- align="center"
|33||T||December 19, 2003||2–2 OT|| align="left"|  Toronto Maple Leafs (2003–04) ||10–19–3–1 || 
|- align="center" bgcolor="#FFBBBB"
|34||L||December 21, 2003||4–5 || align="left"|  New York Islanders (2003–04) ||10–20–3–1 || 
|- align="center" bgcolor="#CCFFCC"
|35||W||December 23, 2003||3–2 || align="left"|  Montreal Canadiens (2003–04) ||11–20–3–1 || 
|- align="center" bgcolor="#FFBBBB"
|36||L||December 27, 2003||1–3 || align="left"|  Buffalo Sabres (2003–04) ||11–21–3–1 || 
|- align="center" bgcolor="#FFBBBB"
|37||L||December 29, 2003||1–3 || align="left"|  Boston Bruins (2003–04) ||11–22–3–1 || 
|- align="center" bgcolor="#FFBBBB"
|38||L||December 31, 2003||1–7 || align="left"| @ Buffalo Sabres (2003–04) ||11–23–3–1 || 
|-

|- align="center"
|39||T||January 1, 2004||2–2 OT|| align="left"|  New Jersey Devils (2003–04) ||11–23–4–1 || 
|- align="center" bgcolor="#FFBBBB"
|40||L||January 3, 2004||2–5 || align="left"| @ Ottawa Senators (2003–04) ||11–24–4–1 || 
|- align="center" bgcolor="#FFBBBB"
|41||L||January 4, 2004||1–4 || align="left"| @ Montreal Canadiens (2003–04) ||11–25–4–1 || 
|- align="center" bgcolor="#FFBBBB"
|42||L||January 7, 2004||0–3 || align="left"|  Phoenix Coyotes (2003–04) ||11–26–4–1 || 
|- align="center" bgcolor="#CCFFCC"
|43||W||January 9, 2004||4–1 || align="left"|  Carolina Hurricanes (2003–04) ||12–26–4–1 || 
|- align="center" bgcolor="#CCFFCC"
|44||W||January 11, 2004||1–0 || align="left"|  Edmonton Oilers (2003–04) ||13–26–4–1 || 
|- align="center"
|45||T||January 14, 2004||3–3 OT|| align="left"|  Calgary Flames (2003–04) ||13–26–5–1 || 
|- align="center" bgcolor="#FF6F6F"
|46||OTL||January 17, 2004||1–2 OT|| align="left"| @ New Jersey Devils (2003–04) ||13–26–5–2 || 
|- align="center" bgcolor="#CCFFCC"
|47||W||January 18, 2004||4–3 || align="left"|  Pittsburgh Penguins (2003–04) ||14–26–5–2 || 
|- align="center" bgcolor="#FFBBBB"
|48||L||January 21, 2004||2–3 || align="left"|  Toronto Maple Leafs (2003–04) ||14–27–5–2 || 
|- align="center" bgcolor="#FFBBBB"
|49||L||January 23, 2004||1–4 || align="left"| @ Florida Panthers (2003–04) ||14–28–5–2 || 
|- align="center" bgcolor="#FFBBBB"
|50||L||January 25, 2004||1–4 || align="left"|  Philadelphia Flyers (2003–04) ||14–29–5–2 || 
|- align="center" bgcolor="#CCFFCC"
|51||W||January 28, 2004||2–1 || align="left"| @ New York Rangers (2003–04) ||15–29–5–2 || 
|- align="center" bgcolor="#CCFFCC"
|52||W||January 29, 2004||5–3 || align="left"| @ Carolina Hurricanes (2003–04) ||16–29–5–2 || 
|- align="center" bgcolor="#FFBBBB"
|53||L||January 31, 2004||1–6 || align="left"|  Vancouver Canucks (2003–04) ||16–30–5–2 || 
|-

|- align="center" bgcolor="#CCFFCC"
|54||W||February 3, 2004||2–1 || align="left"|  Tampa Bay Lightning (2003–04) ||17–30–5–2 || 
|- align="center" bgcolor="#FFBBBB"
|55||L||February 4, 2004||1–5 || align="left"| @ Philadelphia Flyers (2003–04) ||17–31–5–2 || 
|- align="center"
|56||T||February 12, 2004||3–3 OT|| align="left"| @ Carolina Hurricanes (2003–04) ||17–31–6–2 || 
|- align="center" bgcolor="#FFBBBB"
|57||L||February 13, 2004||2–5 || align="left"| @ Nashville Predators (2003–04) ||17–32–6–2 || 
|- align="center" bgcolor="#CCFFCC"
|58||W||February 15, 2004||4–0 || align="left"| @ Chicago Blackhawks (2003–04) ||18–32–6–2 || 
|- align="center"
|59||T||February 17, 2004||1–1 OT|| align="left"|  Ottawa Senators (2003–04) ||18–32–7–2 || 
|- align="center" bgcolor="#CCFFCC"
|60||W||February 19, 2004||3–1 || align="left"|  New Jersey Devils (2003–04) ||19–32–7–2 || 
|- align="center"
|61||T||February 21, 2004||2–2 OT|| align="left"|  Florida Panthers (2003–04) ||19–32–8–2 || 
|- align="center" bgcolor="#FFBBBB"
|62||L||February 23, 2004||3–6 || align="left"|  Tampa Bay Lightning (2003–04) ||19–33–8–2 || 
|- align="center" bgcolor="#FFBBBB"
|63||L||February 25, 2004||1–2 || align="left"|  Carolina Hurricanes (2003–04) ||19–34–8–2 || 
|- align="center" bgcolor="#CCFFCC"
|64||W||February 27, 2004||4–1 || align="left"| @ Florida Panthers (2003–04) ||20–34–8–2 || 
|- align="center" bgcolor="#FFBBBB"
|65||L||February 28, 2004||2–4 || align="left"| @ Tampa Bay Lightning (2003–04) ||20–35–8–2 || 
|-

|- align="center" bgcolor="#FFBBBB"
|66||L||March 2, 2004||0–1 || align="left"|  Florida Panthers (2003–04) ||20–36–8–2 || 
|- align="center" bgcolor="#FFBBBB"
|67||L||March 5, 2004||2–3 || align="left"| @ New York Rangers (2003–04) ||20–37–8–2 || 
|- align="center" bgcolor="#CCFFCC"
|68||W||March 6, 2004||2–1 || align="left"|  Philadelphia Flyers (2003–04) ||21–37–8–2 || 
|- align="center" bgcolor="#FFBBBB"
|69||L||March 8, 2004||1–4 || align="left"|  Ottawa Senators (2003–04) ||21–38–8–2 || 
|- align="center" bgcolor="#FFBBBB"
|70||L||March 10, 2004||0–6 || align="left"|  Buffalo Sabres (2003–04) ||21–39–8–2 || 
|- align="center" bgcolor="#FFBBBB"
|71||L||March 12, 2004||3–4 || align="left"|  Chicago Blackhawks (2003–04) ||21–40–8–2 || 
|- align="center" bgcolor="#FFBBBB"
|72||L||March 13, 2004||2–5 || align="left"| @ Atlanta Thrashers (2003–04) ||21–41–8–2 || 
|- align="center" bgcolor="#FFBBBB"
|73||L||March 16, 2004||1–4 || align="left"| @ Pittsburgh Penguins (2003–04) ||21–42–8–2 || 
|- align="center" bgcolor="#CCFFCC"
|74||W||March 18, 2004||4–3 OT|| align="left"|  New York Rangers (2003–04) ||22–42–8–2 || 
|- align="center"
|75||T||March 20, 2004||2–2 OT|| align="left"|  Atlanta Thrashers (2003–04) ||22–42–9–2 || 
|- align="center" bgcolor="#FFBBBB"
|76||L||March 23, 2004||0–3 || align="left"| @ New York Islanders (2003–04) ||22–43–9–2 || 
|- align="center" bgcolor="#FFBBBB"
|77||L||March 24, 2004||2–3 || align="left"| @ Atlanta Thrashers (2003–04) ||22–44–9–2 || 
|- align="center" bgcolor="#FFBBBB"
|78||L||March 27, 2004||1–4 || align="left"| @ Tampa Bay Lightning (2003–04) ||22–45–9–2 || 
|- align="center" bgcolor="#CCFFCC"
|79||W||March 30, 2004||4–2 || align="left"|  Pittsburgh Penguins (2003–04) ||23–45–9–2 || 
|-

|- align="center"
|80||T||April 1, 2004||3–3 OT|| align="left"| @ Boston Bruins (2003–04) ||23–45–10–2 || 
|- align="center" bgcolor="#FF6F6F"
|81||OTL||April 3, 2004||2–3 OT|| align="left"|  New York Rangers (2003–04) ||23–45–10–3 || 
|- align="center" bgcolor="#FFBBBB"
|82||L||April 4, 2004||3–4 || align="left"| @ Pittsburgh Penguins (2003–04) ||23–46–10–3 || 
|-

|-
| Legend:

Player statistics

Scoring
 Position abbreviations: C = Center; D = Defense; G = Goaltender; LW = Left Wing; RW = Right Wing
  = Joined team via a transaction (e.g., trade, waivers, signing) during the season. Stats reflect time with the Capitals only.
  = Left team via a transaction (e.g., trade, waivers, release) during the season. Stats reflect time with the Capitals only.

Goaltending
  = Joined team via a transaction (e.g., trade, waivers, signing) during the season. Stats reflect time with the Capitals only.

Awards and records

Awards

Milestones

Transactions
The Capitals were involved in the following transactions from June 10, 2003, the day after the deciding game of the 2003 Stanley Cup Finals, through June 7, 2004, the day of the deciding game of the 2004 Stanley Cup Finals.

Trades

Players acquired

Players lost

Signings

Draft picks
Washington's draft picks at the 2003 NHL Entry Draft held at the Gaylord Entertainment Center in Nashville, Tennessee.

Farm teams
The Capitals main American Hockey League affiliate was the Portland Pirates. Though they had no direct ECHL affiliate, players were sent from time to time between the Dayton Bombers and Reading Royals.

See also
 2003–04 NHL season

Notes

References

 
 

Wash
Wash
Washington Capitals seasons
Cap
Cap